Constitutional Assembly elections were held in Luxembourg on 28 July and 4 August 1918. The Party of the Right emerged as the largest party, winning 23 of the 53 seats. The Assembly was tasked with revising the constitution to democratise the country's political structure. The amendments were promulgated on 15 May 1919, introducing proportional representation and the option of holding referendums.

Results

By canton

References

Luxembourg
1918 in Luxembourg
Elections in Luxembourg
Constitution of Luxembourg
History of Luxembourg (1890–1945)
July 1918 events
August 1918 events
Election and referendum articles with incomplete results